Leonie Samantha Elliott is an English actress, best known for her role as Lucille Anderson in the BBC series Call the Midwife. She also starred as Cherry Patterson in the Lenny Henry comedy-drama Danny and the Human Zoo.

Early life

Elliott was born in Brent, London. Her family emigrated from Jamaica in the 1960s. She began acting at eight years old. She attended the Harris School of speech and drama and trained as an actress at the Identity School of Acting in London. Elliott attended the Ellen Wilkinson School for Girls in Ealing.

Career

Elliott played Fiona in the British anthology series Black Mirror, in 2016. Also in 2016, she appeared in an episode of the BBC Medical series Casualty.

She appeared as Cherry Patterson in the Lenny Henry comedy-drama Danny and the Human Zoo, shown on BBC One in August 2015. Other television appearances include Undercover Heart (1998); Tube Tales (1999); Holby City (2002) and The Bill (2004).

She has appeared in several films, including Wondrous Oblivion (1999), written by Paul Morrison; a rite of passage film about an 11-year-old David Wiseman who is mad about cricket but no good at it. She played Jamaican immigrant Judith Samuels, a shy but gifted cricket player who quickly strikes up a friendship with David. Her stage roles include; The Lion King at Lyceum Theatre, London (1998), Annie, UK Tour (1999). In 2012, Elliott appeared in Concrete Jungle written by Bola Agbaje at the Riverside Studios, London. Between November 2015 and January 2016, she appeared in The Lion, The Witch and the Wardrobe at the Birmingham Repertory Theatre in Birmingham.

In 2016, Elliott appeared in "Hated in the Nation", an episode of the anthology series Black Mirror.

In January 2018, she made her debut in the hit BBC series Call the Midwife as Jamaican nurse Lucille Anderson, whose character was based on the many Caribbean nurses who moved to the UK to assist the growing demand of the National Health Service in the 1960s.

On 14 September 2019, she appeared on the celebrity edition of The Chase on ITV, where she won £1,000 for the team, before eventually being eliminated in the Final Chase.

Filmography

Film

Television

References

External links
 

Living people
1988 births
Black British actresses
English television actresses
English film actresses
English stage actresses
People from the London Borough of Brent
English people of Jamaican descent
20th-century English actresses
21st-century English actresses